Jasidih Junction (station code: JSME) is the  one of the cleanest railway station serving Jasidih which is the satellite town of Deoghar city in the Deoghar district in the Indian state of Jharkhand.

Administration 
Jasidih Junction is under the Asansol division of Eastern Railway zone of the Indian Railways.

Further extension

The -long Jasidih–Hansdiha–Pirpainti line is under construction. As of April 2021, work is under progress on Mohanpur–Hansdiha and Godda–Pirpainti sections. The  Hansdiha–Godda section was inaugurated on 8 April 2021 and a Humsafar Express runs weekly from Godda to New Delhi. This line is considered important to connect the Godda district in the Santhal Pargana division of Jharkhand with the rest of India. The  Godda–Pakur line is also planned

Facilities 
The major facilities available are retiring room, waiting hall, computerized reservation facility, reservation counter, 2-wheeler and 4-wheeler vehicle parking. The vehicles are allowed to enter the station premises. The station also has STD/ISD/PCO telephone booth, ATM counter, toilets, refreshment room, tea stall and book stall.

Nearest airports
The nearest airports to Jasidih Junction are:
Deoghar Airport, Deoghar 
Birsa Munda Airport, Ranchi 
Gaya Airport 
Lok Nayak Jayaprakash Airport, Patna 
Netaji Subhas Chandra Bose International Airport, Kolkata 
Kazi Nazrul Islam Airport, Andal, Durgapur 
Varanasi Airport

Gallery

Originating trains 
1. Jasidih - Tambaram weekly sf express.
 
2. Jasidih - Pune Jn. weekly express.
 
3. Jasidih - Vasco-da-gama weekly express. 

4. Jasidih - SMVT, Bangaluru weekly sf express.

References

External links 
 
 

Railway stations in Deoghar district
Railway junction stations in Jharkhand
Asansol railway division
Railway stations opened in 1871